The 2013 Recopa Sudamericana (officially the 2013 Recopa Santander Sudamericana for sponsorship reasons) was the 21st edition of the Recopa Sudamericana, the football competition organized by CONMEBOL between the winners of the previous season's two major South American club tournaments, the Copa Libertadores and the Copa Sudamericana.

The competition was contested in two-legged home-and-away format between two Brazilian teams, Corinthians, the 2012 Copa Libertadores champion, and São Paulo, the 2012 Copa Sudamericana champion.
The first leg was hosted by São Paulo at Estádio do Morumbi in São Paulo on July 3, 2013, while the second leg was hosted by Corinthians at Estádio do Pacaembu in São Paulo on July 17, 2013.

Corinthians won both legs, the first leg by 2–1, and the second leg by 2–0, to win their first Recopa Sudamericana title. Corinthians captain Danilo was selected as best player of the tournament.

Format
The Recopa Sudamericana was played on a home-and-away two-legged basis, with the Copa Libertadores champion hosting the second leg. If tied on aggregate, the away goals rule was not used, and 30 minutes of extra time was played. If still tied after extra time, the penalty shoot-out was used to determine the winner.

Qualified teams

Venues

Match details

First leg

Second leg

References

2013
2013 in South American football
Sport Club Corinthians Paulista matches
São Paulo FC matches
2013 in Brazilian football